Choturtha Matra is a 2001 Bangladeshi television drama film written and directed by Nurul Alam Atique. The film based on a story in the same name written by Shahidul Jahir. It stars Jayanta Chattopadhyay, Tamalika Karmakar, Sonia Zafar, M.M. Morshed, Shamsul Alom Bakul and Fazlur Rahman Babu.

The story of a lonely man who caught in a perpetual cycle of time. He hangs in limbo, between reality and dreams. His only companions a maid, a cat, and a grandfather clock. The same things are happening in his life and he becomes increasingly frustrated.

The film won Meril Prothom Alo Critics Choice Awards in 2002 in three categories.

Cast
 Jayanta Chattopadhyay as Abdul Karim
 Tamalika Karmakar as maid servant
 M.M. Morshed as the paper seller
 Sonia Zafar as the woman
 Shamsul Alam Bakul as landowner
 Junaid Halim as candyseller
 Munir as children I
 Shobuj as children II
 Arif as children II
 Rajeeb as children II
 Fazlur Rahman Babu as neighbour I
 Ashoke Bepari as neighbour II
 Bablu Biswas  as neighbour III
 Dardesh Chacha as hores rider

Awards

References

External links

2001 films
2001 television films
2001 drama films
2001 independent films
2000s Bengali-language films
Bengali-language television programming in Bangladesh
Bengali-language Bangladeshi films
Bangladeshi drama films
Bangladeshi television films
Bangladeshi independent films